The Malta International Airshow is an annual air show held at the Malta International Airport organized by the Malta Aviation Society. It was first held in September 1993 over Marsamxett Harbour, but then moved to Malta International Airport with the exception of the years 2007 and 2009. During these years, the event was held at St. Paul's Bay due to the construction of new hangars at the airport, where cranes would have been a hazard for the low flying aircraft.

Active years 1993 to 2021; however 2018 and 2019 did not take place due to lack of funds, and 2020 was skipped due to Covid-19. 2021 is the 26th edition held at Malta International Airport.

Gallery

References

External links

Official website

Air shows
Annual events in Malta
1993 establishments in Malta
Recurring events established in 1993
Autumn events in Malta